Mercredi is the French word for the day Wednesday and is named after the Roman deity Mercury.

Mercredi can also refer to:
Duncan Mercredi - a Canadian poet
Ovide Mercredi – a Canadian politician.
Mercredi – a character in the anime series Kiddy Grade.